Überackern is a municipality in the district of Braunau am Inn in the Austrian state of Upper Austria.

Geography
Überackern lies in the Innviertel near the confluence of the Salzach and the Inn. It is surrounded by the Weilhart forest. About 77 percent of the municipality is forest and 15 percent farmland.

Villages
Inhabitants as 1 January 2020
 Aufhausen (7)
 Berg (6)
 Kreuzlinden (166)
 Mühltal (93})
 Überackern (249)
 Weng (162)

References

Cities and towns in Braunau am Inn District